Hussein Luaibi (born 1953) is an Iraqi football coach and former footballer. He played as a forward.

Club career
Luaibi started playing for Al-Najda FC and then Al-Aliyat FC. He then moved to Al-Shorta, where he played with them for six seasons, then moved to Al-Tayaran and stayed with them for 10 seasons until his retirement in 1989. In 27 years of playing he did not get one color card.

Asian title and the first Iraqi goal in FIFA U-20
Luaibi played the youth team and won the 1977 AFC Youth Championship in Tehran, than played in the 1977 FIFA World Youth Championship in Tunisia with the first participation of Iraq in the history of the tournament and scored the first goal of an Iraqi player in the history of this tournament, which scored against Soviet Union on 26 June 1977, and scored against Austria too.

International career
On September 5, 1976 Luaibi played his debut with Iraq against Saudi Arabia in fully international match, in the Friendly match in Riyadh, which ended 0-0.

International goals
Scores and results list Iraq's goal tally first.

Awards
 Finalist Pestabola Merdeka 1977 with Iraq
 Asian Youth champion in 1977 with Iraq U-19
 Winner of the Al-Wehdat Championship in 1986 with Al-Tayaran
 Winner of the Arab Police Championship in 1976 with Al-Shorta

References

1953 births
Living people
Association football forwards
Iraqi footballers
Al-Shorta SC players
Al-Quwa Al-Jawiya players
Iraq international footballers
Iraqi football managers
Expatriate football managers in the United Arab Emirates